Hobart is an English surname. Notable people with the surname include: 

Aaron Hobart (1787–1858), US Representative from Massachusetts
Albinia Hobart (1737/8–1816), British celebrity
Barry Hobart (1942–2011), a Dayton, Ohio television horror host known as "Dr. Creep"
Clarence Hobart (1870–1930), American tennis player 
Garret Hobart (1844–1899), 24th Vice President of the United States (1897–1899)
George Hobart, 3rd Earl of Buckinghamshire (1731–1804)
George V. Hobart (1867–1926), humorist and playwright
Harrison Carroll Hobart (1815–1902), Union Army colonel during the American Civil War, politician, and lawyer
Henry Hobart (disambiguation)
John Hobart (disambiguation)
Ken Hobart (born 1961), American football player
Lauren Hobart (born 1969/1970), American businesswoman
Lewis P. Hobart (1873–1954), American architect
Miles Hobart (1595–1632), English politician
Percy Hobart (1885–1957), British Second World War major general and armoured vehicle innovator
Robert Hobart (1836–1928), British politician
Robert Hobart, 4th Earl of Buckinghamshire
Rose Hobart (1906–2000), American actress
Sarah Dyer Hobart (1845–1921), American poet and author
Simon Hobart (1964–2005), British gay nightlife impresario

Surnames from given names